The Colombia women's national under-16 and under-17 basketball team is a national basketball team of Colombia, administered by the Federación Colombiana de Baloncesto.

It represents the country in international under-16 and under-17 (under age 16 and under age 17) women's basketball competitions.
 
It appeared at the 2011 South American U17 Basketball Championship for Women.

See also
Colombia women's national basketball team
Colombia women's national under-19 basketball team
Colombia men's national under-17 basketball team

References

External links
 Archived records of Colombia team participations

B
Women's national under-17 basketball teams